The 2011 Armenian Cup was the 20th season of Armenia's football knockout competition. It featured the eight 2011 Premier League teams. The tournament began on 10 March 2011. Pyunik were the defending champions. The winners entered the second qualifying round of the 2011–12 UEFA Europa League.

Results

Quarter-finals
All eight Premier League clubs competed in this round. The first legs were played on 10 and 11 March 2011, with the second legs to be competed on 14 and 15 March 2011.

|}

Semi-finals
The four winners from the quarterfinals entered this round. The first legs were played on 30 March and 6 April 2011, with the second legs to be competed on 20 and 27 April 2011.

|}

Final

See also
 2011 Armenian Premier League
 2011 Armenian First League

External links

 2011 Cup draw

2011
Armenian Cup
Cup